This is a list of valleys within the Lower Colorado River Valley corridor, from the Hoover Dam (Lake Mead) region, south to the Mexico border.

Six valleys are contained within neighboring bajadas and mountain ranges, on the Colorado River proper; other tributary valleys flow during desert rain episodes, and are otherwise dry washes. Only higher elevation associated mountains may have longer sustained pools of water in dry wash riverbeds.

Colorado River valleys
Cottonwood Valley (Arizona/Nevada)
Mohave Valley
Parker Valley
Palo Verde Valley
Cibola Valley
Gila Valley (Yuma County)

Tributary valleys to the Colorado River watershed
(listed north-to-south, the path of the Colorado River)

Nevada
Eldorado Valley-(endorheic)
Piute Valley
California
Piute Valley & Wash
Chemehuevi Valley & Wash
Whipple Mountains
Vidal Valley & Wash
Rice Valley & "Big Wash"
"McCoy Wash"
Chocolate Mountains
Winterhaven, California
Mexico

Arizona
----Black Mountains (Arizona)
Sacramento Valley
Bill Williams River
Bouse Wash & La Posa Plain
Gila River
Yuma, Arizona